was a Japanese sumo wrestler from the Edo period. Officially recognized as the fourth yokozuna, he was however effectively the first, as he was the first (along with Onogawa) to be awarded the title during his lifetime. He achieved great fame and, though championships from this period are unofficial, he achieved the equivalent of 21 tournament championships. He was also the coach of Raiden Tameemon.

Early career 
Tanikaze was born  in Miyagi District, Mutsu Province (now Wakabayashi, Sendai). He was known for having an outstanding physique from an early age and became an apprentice of a wrestler named Sekinoto in 1768. Later Sekinoto inherited the name Isenoumi. With a height of 189 cm and a weight of 169 kg, Tanikaze was extremely large in comparison with most Japanese men of his era. In April of the following year, he went to Edo-sumo and was given the shikona, or ring name,  by the Date clan. Kanban-ōzeki were sumo wrestlers who were listed as ōzeki in the ranking simply because they were big and good-looking enough to briefly fill a gap when an official ōzeki was absent. The real talents were below the sekiwake rank, and the ōzeki rarely wrestled, and if they did, it was only against other kanban-ōzeki or lower-ranked rikishi. Most of the kanban-ōzeki disappeared after Tanikaze career peak. Tanikaze was recognised for his ability and had to relinquish his title, dropping to maegashira, from where he retained his san'yaku rank on merit.

Winning streak
From March 1778 to February 1782, Tanikaze scored 63 consecutive victories. During this period, he only lost one bout to Onogawa Kisaburō in February 1782. This streak was recorded as the longest run of consecutive victories in sumo bouts at that time. This record remained unbroken until Futabayama, 150 years later, who scored 69 consecutive victories in 1938. At the time however, rikishi travelled freely between Edo, Kyoto and Osaka, and perform at each tournament. Altough Tanikaze wrestled in other cities and gained a record of 98 consecutive wins, his official record for consecutive victories generally refers to '63 consecutive victories in the Edo main tournament'.After losing to Onogawa, Tanikaze won another 43 consecutive victories in a row.

Yokozuna
He also became one of the first two sumo wrestlers to be allowed to perform a yokozuna dohyō-iri. At the time of his promotion, he and Onogawa were ranked as sekiwake. At the time, the rank of yokozuna was more of an honorary title and wrestlers weren't designated as such in the banzuke, or ranking sheet, hence explaining why the two wrestlers are promoted while being ranked at sekiwake. Officially Tanikaze is recorded as being the 4th yokozuna in sumo history but is effectively the first, as the first three were awarded the title posthumously.

Death and posthumous influence

On 9 January 1795, Tanikaze contracted influenza, which spread throughout Edo, and died suddenly at the age of 46 while still active. The wrestler who succeeded Tanikaze as ōzeki was Raiden Tameemon, who was an apprentice of Tanikaze. He was on another winning streak of 35 bouts at the time of his death, making him a leading figure of sumo during the Tenmei and Kansei eras. In the top makuuchi division, Tanikaze won 258 bouts and lost only 14 bouts, achieving a winning percentage of 94.9. Tanikaze was burried in his hometown of Wakabayashi, Sendai and his tomb serves as a monument in a residential area.
The Tanikaze shikona became a prestigious name in the Edo-sumo association and several wrestlers were given the opportunity to take it, but all declined. Today, the name is said to be , meaning that it is a name which is no longer allowed to be used.
Tanikaze was a very popular rikishi. Unlike other wrestlers of his day, many nishiki-e portraits and images of him participating in bouts still remain.

Fighting style
Tanikaze's reputation at the time was that he had a great strength. He is frequently described as an expert in sumo, short in the waist and quick in the stride, with a strong back and quick feet.

Family
He had a younger brother, Dategaseki Moriemon (1756-1807), who was also a sumo wrestler and reached the top division himself in 1791. They were the second pair of brothers in sumo history to both reach makuuchi.

Homage
Tanikaze is the wrestler chosen to represent sumo in the popular nishiki-e 'The three pleasures of Edo', representing the three most popular entertainments at the time (sumo, kabuki and yoshiwara).

Tanikaze makes an appearance in the Record of Ragnarok manga series, where he appears on flashbacks at the time of his retirement and cheers on Raiden during his fight.

Top division record
The actual time the tournaments were held during the year in this period often varied.
Tanikaze's first three tournaments were as a "guest" ōzeki, see above.
Tanikaze's record for the Spring 1776 tournament is unknown.
 
 
    
    
  
 
    
    
  

    
    
  

    
    
  

    
    
  

    
    
  

    
    
  

    
    
  

    
    
  

    
    
  

    
    
  

    
    
  

    
    
  

    
    
  

    
    
  

    
    
  

    
    
  

    
    
  

    
    
  

    
    
  

    
    
  

    
    
  

    
    
  

    
    
  

    
    
  

    
    
  

*Championships for the best record in a tournament were not recognized or awarded before the 1909 summer tournament, and the unofficial championships above are historically conferred. For more information, see yūshō.

See also

List of sumo record holders
List of yokozuna
Glossary of sumo terms
List of past sumo wrestlers

References

External links
 Tanikaze Kajinosuke Tournament Results

Deaths from influenza
Infectious disease deaths in Japan
Japanese sumo wrestlers
Sportspeople from Sendai
Sumo people from Miyagi Prefecture
Yokozuna
1750 births
1795 deaths
Sumo wrestlers who died while active
18th-century wrestlers